India competed at the 2019 Military World Games in Wuhan from 18 to 27 October 2019. It sent a delegation consisting of 54 athletes competing in nine sports for the event.

Participants 

Source

Medal by sports 

5 para athletics gold and one bronze tennis not counted at medal table because of demonstration sports.

Medalists

References 

Nations at the 2019 Military World Games
2019 in Indian sport